Is It Wrong to Try to Pick Up Girls in a Dungeon? is an anime series based on the light novel series created by Fujino Ōmori. The story follows the exploits of Bell Cranel, a 14-year-old solo adventurer under the goddess Hestia.

The anime is produced by J.C.Staff and directed by Hideki Tachibana. The season was originally scheduled to premiere in July 2020, but was delayed to October 3, 2020, due to the COVID-19 pandemic. The third season adapts volumes nine to eleven of the light novel.

The opening theme for the third season is "Over and Over" by Yuka Iguchi while the ending theme is "Evergreen" by sajou no hana.


Episode list

References

External links
  
 

Is It Wrong to Try to Pick Up Girls in a Dungeon? episode lists
2020 Japanese television seasons
Anime postponed due to the COVID-19 pandemic